Carbromal is a hypnotic/sedative originally synthesized in 1909 by Bayer and subsequently marketed as Adalin. The drug was later sold by Parke-Davis in combination with pentobarbital, under the name Carbrital.

Synthesis

Diethylmalonic acid [510-20-3] (1) is decarboxylated to 2-ethylvaleric acid [20225-24-5] (2). The Hell-Volhard-Zelinsky reaction converts this to 2-Bromo-2-Ethylbutyryl Bromide [26074-53-3] (3). Reaction with urea with affords carbromal (4).

See also 
 Acecarbromal
 Bromisoval
 Apronal

References 

Hypnotics
Sedatives
Ureas
Organobromides
GABAA receptor positive allosteric modulators